Iran Air Flight 291 was a flight from Mashad Airport to Tehran-Mehrabad Airport that crashed on 21 January 1980 during its approach to Tehran-Mehrabad runway 29 in foggy and snowy weather conditions, killing all 128 people on board. At the time, Iran Air Flight 291 was the deadliest aircraft disaster in Iranian history.

Aircraft 
The aircraft involved was Boeing 727-86 with registration EP-IRD (factory no. 19817, serial no. 537) was built in 1968 and made its first flight on 17 February. The aircraft was powered by three Pratt & Whitney JT8D-7B turbofan engines.

Accident 
On the day of the accident, Iranian air traffic controllers went on strike, which led to hundreds of domestic flights being cancelled. Then at 16:00 the strike was interrupted, and flights resumed. At 17:40, Flight 291 departed from Mashad Airport bound for Tehran-Mehrabad Airport in Iran. There were 8 crew members and 120 passengers on board (initial reports stated that there were 8 crew members and 116 passengers).

At 18:52 local time, the controller at Mehrabad airport in Tehran gave the crew a direct approach to the runway 29. Then at about 19:05, the dispatcher instructed the crew to take a 360° heading to reach the non-directional beacon of the Varamin approach. During the approach, the first officer told the captain that the VORTAC was giving the wrong radial course, but he did not respond to this message. All 8 crew members and 120 passengers died in the crash, and the plane was destroyed.

Cause 
Investigators concluded that the probable cause of the crash was believed to be an inoperable instrument landing system and ground radar. The head of Iran's Civil Aviation Authority and five other officials were charged with manslaughter as a result of the crash of Flight 291.

References

External links 
Airport situation following the crash from Associated Press Archive

Airliner accidents and incidents involving controlled flight into terrain
Accidents and incidents involving the Boeing 727
Airliner accidents and incidents caused by instrument failure
Airliner accidents and incidents caused by weather
Aviation accidents and incidents in 1980
Aviation accidents and incidents in Iran
January 1980 events in Asia
1980 in Iran
291